The 250th Rifle Division was formed from a cadre of NKVD border troops as a standard Red Army rifle division, very shortly after the German invasion, in the Moscow Military District. It was one of a series of similar NKVD-based divisions formed at that time. It served in the heavy fighting around Smolensk in July, then later in the defensive operations around Kalinin. During the Soviet winter counteroffensive it was part of the forces of Kalinin Front that drove the German forces away from Toropets. In the initial phase of Operation Bagration the division was given special recognition for its role in the liberation of the Belorussian city of Bobruisk. The 250th had a distinguished career as a combat unit, ending its combat path in Berlin.

Formation 
The 250th Rifle Division began forming within days of the start of the German invasion on June 26, 1941, at Vladimir, in the Moscow Military District, based on a cadre of 1,500 officers and men of the NKVD Internal Troops. The remaining soldiers and officers came from the reserves. The NKVD order stated that the division was to be ready for service by July 17; in fact it was ready ten days earlier. Its order of battle was as follows:
 918th Rifle Regiment
 922nd Rifle Regiment
 926th Rifle Regiment
 790th Artillery Regiment
 308th Antitank Battalion
 527th Antiaircraft Battalion
 418th Sapper Battalion
 670th Signal Battalion
 329th Reconnaissance Company

The division was first assigned to 30th Army in Western Front. On July 21, the army commander disbanded the 110th Tank Division and distributed its battalions to his rifle divisions; this battalion was supposed to consist of two companies, one of ten T-34s and one of ten BT of T-26 light tanks, plus a command tank.

Combat service 
The 250th was almost immediately committed to heavy fighting north of Smolensk, in the course of which, on July 26, the divisional commander, Mjr. Gen. Ivan Gorbachyov, died of wounds sustained in combat south of Belyi. In the course of this fighting, by Aug. 1 the three rifle regiments were reduced to the following strengths:
 918th: 727 men
 922nd: 1,195 men
 926th: 526 men
After about two weeks of combat, the division had lost about half its strength. As well, by Aug. 5 the tank battalion was down to eight T-34s, one T-26, two BT-7s and six BT-5s, when the division was transferred to 29th Army. By early October the 250th had lost all its armor, and was reduced to 500 men fighting at Olenino. It received 500 stragglers from the Soviet rear, but this did not make it a cohesive unit, and the army did not consider the division a combat-effective unit during the following months.

While retreating to the Kalinin area from Rzhev, the division became part of the newly formed Kalinin Front, under command of Col. Gen. Ivan Konev. In spite of its combat status, in the dire circumstances of the time, on October 15 the 250th was ordered to "stubbornly defend" its sector, alongside the 220th Rifle Division, while other forces of the front prepared a counterattack against the German armor beginning to move north of the city. On the 18th, Konev reported that both divisions were falling back under German pressure. On October 21, the two divisions were assigned to 22nd Army, "to prevent an enemy breakthrough to Torzhok". By October 23 the Germans were still advancing slowly, with much air and artillery support, against the "skeletal" remnants of the division, but it was still offering resistance, and in the end the German plan to advance from Kalinin was stymied.

The 250th spent the winter in Kalinin Front, and in April 1942 was reassigned to the newly-forming 53rd Army in Northwestern Front, where it remained in the vicinity of Demyansk until February 1943. After a brief posting to 1st Shock Army in the same Front, in early March the 250th got new orders to re-deploy to the new 2nd Reserve Army, in the Yelets, Lepetsk and Lebedian regions, in anticipation of the German summer offensive. In April, 2nd Reserve became the 63rd Army, assigned to Bryansk Front, and the division was also assigned to 35th Rifle Corps, where it would remain for the duration. In this Front (Belorussian Front after October 20) the 250th would take part in the difficult fighting through Bryansk and towards the Dniepr River until February 1944.

On February 18, 63rd Army was dissolved, and 35th Rifle Corps was reassigned to 3rd Army, where it would remain for the duration. At the outset of Operation Bagration, on June 23, 35th Rifle Corps, under command of Major General Viktor Zholudev, formed one of the two assault corps of 3rd Army, packed into less than ten kilometres of front opposite the northern half of the sector held by the German 134th Infantry Division. On the second day of the offensive, at 0400 hours, the assault force unleashed a massive 2-hour bombardment on the defenders in the Rogachev area, but by 0800 only the first line of German trenches had been taken, as bad weather had scrubbed the planned air support. As the weather cleared towards evening, further lines were taken, and the 9th Tank Corps prepared to exploit a breakthrough. Northwest of Bobruysk on June 26, the tankers cut the road to Mogilev behind the German XXXV Corps, with 35th and 41st Rifle Corps close behind and the 134th Infantry shattered and in flight. On the following day Bobruysk was surrounded, along with most of German 9th Army, and it fell to the 250th to help clear and liberate the city, for which the men and women of the division received the name of that city as an honorific. On August 9, the 250th was also awarded the Order of Suvorov II Class.

Into Germany 
In August, the division, along with its army and corps, were transferred to 2nd Belorussian Front, where it would remain for the next six months, assisting in the liberation of the remainder of Belorussia and eastern Poland. It was still in this front at the outset of the Vistula-Oder Offensive in January 1945, but in February was reassigned to 3rd Belorussian Front, fighting in East Prussia. In April, 3rd Army was once again reassigned, this time to back to 1st Belorussian Front, in preparation for the assault on the German capital. When the shooting stopped, the division was in the enemy's lair of Berlin, and the final full title of its men and women was "250th Rifle, Bobruysk, Order of the Red Banner, Order of Suvorov Division" (Russian: 250-я стрелковая Бобруйская Краснознамённая ордена Суворова дивизия).

Postwar 
The division moved to the Minsk Military District with the 35th Rifle Corps postwar. It was stationed in Borisov and disbanded in June 1946, along with the rest of the corps.

References

External links
Ivan Sergevich Gorbachyov
Pavel Afinogenovich Stepanenko
Makhmud Abdul-Rzaievich Abilov

250
Military units and formations established in 1941
Military units and formations disestablished in 1946
Military units and formations awarded the Order of the Red Banner